Étienne Galloy is a Canadian actor and filmmaker from Quebec. He is most noted for his performance as Stefie in the 2016 film Prank, for which he received a Prix Iris nomination for Revelation of the Year at the 19th Quebec Cinema Awards in 2017.

He has also appeared in the films Little Brother (Petit frère), Genesis (Genèse), Before We Explode (Avant qu'on explose), Heart Bomb (Une bombe au cœur) and Kuessipan, and the television series No More Parents, Marc-en-Peluche, Karl & Max, GAME(R) and Olivier.

The Marina (La Marina), which he co-directed with Christophe Levac as both actors' directorial debut film, was released in 2020.

References

External links

21st-century Canadian male actors
21st-century Canadian male writers
21st-century Canadian screenwriters
Canadian male film actors
Canadian male television actors
Canadian male child actors
Canadian male screenwriters
Canadian screenwriters in French
Male actors from Quebec
Film directors from Quebec
Writers from Quebec
French Quebecers
Living people
Year of birth missing (living people)